Eulimostraca subcarinata is a species of sea snail, a marine gastropod mollusk in the family Eulimidae.

Description 
The maximum recorded shell length is 5.4 mm.

Habitat 
Minimum recorded depth is 0 m. Maximum recorded depth is 192 m.

References

External links

Eulimidae
Gastropods described in 1841